The 2015–16 Magyar Kupa (English: Hungarian Cup) was the 76th season of Hungary's annual knock-out cup football competition. It started with the first match of the first round on 5 August 2015 and will end with the final held on 14 May 2016 at Groupama Aréna, Budapest. Ferencváros are the defending champions, having won their 21st cup competition last season. The winner of the competition will qualify for the first qualifying round of the 2016–17 UEFA Europa League. Teams which are involved in 2015–16 UEFA Champions League (Videoton) and 2015–16 UEFA Europa League (Ferencváros, MTK and Debrecen) joined only in the third round.

Format
The tournament rounds will be played in knockout system. The first three-round and the final will consist one-leg (in the first three-round lower ranked team or if the teams are equalled first-drawn team plays home). In the rounds 4 to 6, each tie is played over two legs, with each team playing one leg at home.
In the first round professional teams (from 2015–16 Nemzeti Bajnokság I and 2015–16 Nemzeti Bajnokság II) cannot be paired with each other. In the second and third round any remaining teams from 2015–16 Nemzeti Bajnokság I cannot be paired with each other.

Tie-breaker criteria
In the first three rounds and the final the team that scores more goals advances to the next round (in the final the team wins the cup). If the score is level, then thirty minutes of  extra time is played, divided into two fifteen-minutes halves. If the score is level again after extra time, the tie is decided by penalty shoot-out.
In the round 4 to 6 the team that scores more goals on aggregate over the two legs advances to the next round. If the aggregate score is level, the away goals rule is applied, i.e., the team that scores more goals away from home over the two legs advances. If away goals are also equal, then thirty minutes of extra time is played, divided into two fifteen-minutes halves. The away goals rule is again applied after extra time, i.e., if there are goals scored during extra time and the aggregate score is still level, the visiting team advances by virtue of more away goals scored. If no goals are scored during extra time, the tie is decided by penalty shoot-out.

Round of 128
Matches were played on 5, 9, 11, 12 and 13 August 2015 and involved the teams qualified through the local cup competitions during the previous season, Nemzeti Bajnokság III, Nemzeti Bajnokság II and the Nemzeti Bajnokság I teams.

Draw
The draw for the first round was held on 21 July 2015. In this round no professional clubs could play against each other, therefore every team from 2015–16 Nemzeti Bajnokság I and 2015–16 Nemzeti Bajnokság II played with lower ranked teams. Originally 116 teams could compete, but five teams withdrew, therefore Inter CDF, Somos, Andráshida SC, Géderlaki KSE and Balatonfüred are bye to next round.

Matches

Notes
Note 2: Dudar played their match at Zirci SE Sporttelep in Zirc.

Round of 64
Matches were played on 22 and 23 September 2015. It involved 51 winners from the first round and five teams which were bye in the first round (Inter CDF, Somos, Andráshida SC, Géderlaki KSE and Balatonfüred).

Draw
The draw for the second round was held on 25 August 2015. In this round clubs from 2015–16 Nemzeti Bajnokság I cannot play against each other, therefore every team from NBI will play with lower ranked teams.

Matches

Round of 32
Matches were played on 13 and 14 October 2015. It involved 28 winners from the second round and four teams which were involved in 2015–16 UEFA Champions League (Videoton) and 2015–16 UEFA Europa League (Ferencváros, MTK and Debrecen).

Draw
The draw for the third round was held on 25 September 2015.

Matches

{{football box collapsible
|date = 
|time = 14:00 (CEST)
|team1 = Kisvárda (II)
|score = 1–2
|report = Report
|team2 = Békéscsaba (I)
|goals1 = Koszta 
|goals2 = Koroudijev Laczkó 
|stadium = Várda SE Sporttelep
|location = Kisvárda
|referee = Viktor Kassai
}}

Round of 16
Matches were played on 27 and 28 October 2015 for the first leg and 17 and 18 November 2015 for the second leg. It involved 16 winners from the third round.

Draw
The draw for the fourth round was held on 16 October 2015.

Matches
First leg

Second leg

Quarter-finals
The official matchday for the first leg is 17 February 2016 and for the second leg is 2 March 2016. It will involve 8 winners from the fourth round.

Draw
The draw for the fifth round was held on 27 November 2015.

Matches
First leg

Second leg

Semi-finals
The official matchday for the first leg is 30 March 2016 and for the second leg is 20 April 2016. It will involve 4 winners from the fifth round.

Matches
First leg

Second leg

Final
The final will be played on 7 May 2016. The match will be held at Groupama Arena, Budapest. It will involve 2 winners from the sixth round.

Match

Top goalscorers
Note: Players and teams in bold''' are still active in the competition.

Updated to games played on 18 November 2015

See also
 2015–16 Nemzeti Bajnokság I
 2015–16 Nemzeti Bajnokság II

References

External links
 Official site 
 Official rules 
 soccerway.com

2015–16 in Hungarian football
2015–16 European domestic association football cups
2015-16